Minnesota Golden Gophers    

Cole Konrad (born April 2, 1984) is an American retired mixed martial arts fighter. Konrad won a gold medal at the 2005 Pan-American Championships. He won the NCAA wrestling championships in 2006 and 2007 at 285 pounds and finished third at the 2006 World University Championships at 120 kilograms. He was the first Bellator Heavyweight World Champion.

Amateur wrestling career

High school
After transferring from New London High School in New London, Wisconsin to Freedom High School in Freedom, Wisconsin. Konrad compiled a 101–15 record and won the 2002 Wisconsin state championship. He was listed as a first team high school All-American at 275 pounds by both the Amateur Wrestling News and Wrestling USA Magazine. During his high school career, Konrad also excelled at freestyle and Greco-Roman wrestling. He won the 2002 Junior National Championships in both styles.

Collegiate
Konrad wrestled at the University of Minnesota where he won two NCAA titles. The first came during an undefeated junior season of 2006 and he followed that up with another undefeated, title winning performance in 2007. His overall collegiate record finished at 155–13, with 10 of those losses coming during his freshman season.

Konrad gained notoriety in wrestling through his rivalry with Steve Mocco. Mocco is a two time NCAA champion for Oklahoma State and Iowa. As Mocco attempted to win his third NCAA title during the 2006 season, Konrad beat Mocco a total of three times including a pin at the National Duals and a 5–2 victory in the NCAA title match. Konrad is the all-time Minnesota record holder for consecutive wins with 76. He recorded a pin in his final collegiate match over Penn State wrestler Aaron Anspach.

International
While concentrating on collegiate wrestling, Konrad has managed to develop a strong international record as well. In 2005 he won a gold medal at the Pan American Championships in Guatemala City, Guatemala and finished third at the U.S. World Team Trials. In 2006 he won the bronze medal for the 264.5 pounds freestyle weight class at the World University Championships in Ulaanbaatar, Mongolia.

Mixed martial arts career
Konrad made his professional mixed martial arts debut on January 23, 2010, defeating Gary "Chief" Hamen on the Martial Arts Xtreme promotion's Max Fights 8 with a neck crank, which is a modified rear naked choke from half guard that his training partner, Brock Lesnar, nicknamed the "Polar Bear Choke". His second professional fight was a TKO in the first round over Joel Wyatt.

Bellator Fighting Championships
Konrad made his Bellator debut May 6, 2010 at Bellator 17, where he won a unanimous decision against Pat Bennett.  He went on to win his next three fights by unanimous decision: Bellator 22 against John Orr, Bellator 25 against Rogent Lloret in the Bellator Season Three Heavyweight tournament quarter-final, and at Bellator 29 against Damian Grabowski in the Bellator Season Three Heavyweight tournament semi-final. Konrad won the Heavyweight tournament final and became the first Bellator heavyweight champion at Bellator 32 with an Americana submission in round 1 against Neil Grove. 
In 2011 Konrad won a non-title decision over Paul Buentello.  This fight surprised most observers, as it was contested entirely standing, unlike most Konrad matches.  More than 18 months after winning the title, Konrad finally had his first official title defense, against Season Five Tournament Winner Eric Prindle, another opponent known primarily for his striking.  This time, Konrad took the fight to the ground quickly and dispatched Prindle within a minute.  According to his coach, Greg Nelson, Konrad trained for a single day to prepare for this fight.

Konrad retired from MMA competition on September 12, 2012 to become a full-time commodities broker.

Championships and accomplishments

Mixed martial arts
Bellator Fighting Championships
Bellator Heavyweight World Championship (One time; First)
One successful title defense
Bellator Season 3 Heavyweight Tournament Winner
Fight Matrix
2010 Rookie of the Year

Amateur wrestling
International Federation of Associated Wrestling Styles
2007 Sunkist Kids International Open Senior Greco-Roman Bronze Medalist
2005 Pan American Championships Senior Freestyle Gold Medalist
International University Sports Federation
2006 FISU World University Championships Freestyle Bronze Medalist
USA Wrestling
USA Senior Freestyle National Championship Runner-up (2007)
USA University Freestyle National Championship (2006)
USA University Folkstyle National Championship (2003)
USA Junior Freestyle National Championship (2002)
USA Junior Greco-Roman National Championship (2002)
ASICS Tiger High School All-American First Team (2002)
USA Junior Greco-Roman National Championship Runner-up (2001)
Northern Plains Junior Freestyle Regional Championship Runner-up (2001)
Northern Plains Junior Greco-Roman Regional Championship (2001)
2004 South Regional Olympic Team Trials Qualifier Senior Greco-Roman Winner
2003 FILA Junior Freestyle World Team Trials Winner
2003 FILA Junior Greco-Roman World Team Trials Winner
National Collegiate Athletic Association
NCAA Division I Collegiate National Championship (2006, 2007)
NCAA Division I Collegiate National Championship Runner-up (2005)
NCAA Division I All-American (2004, 2005, 2006, 2007)
Big Ten Conference Championship (2005, 2006, 2007)
Big Ten Jesse Owens Male Athlete of the Year (2007)
Wisconsin Interscholastic Athletic Association
WIAA Division II High School State Championship (2002)
WIAA Division II All-State (2002)
Valley 8 Conference Championship (2002)
WIAA Division I All-State (2001)

Mixed martial arts record

|-
| Win
|align=center| 9–0
| Eric Prindle
| Submission (kimura)
| Bellator 70
| 
|align=center| 1
|align=center| 1:00
| New Orleans, Louisiana, United States
| 
|-
| Win
|align=center| 8–0
| Paul Buentello
| Decision (unanimous)
| Bellator 48
| 
|align=center| 3
|align=center| 5:00
| Uncasville, Connecticut, United States
| 
|-
| Win
|align=center| 7–0
| Neil Grove
| Submission (keylock)
| Bellator 32
| 
|align=center| 1
|align=center| 4:45
| Kansas City, Missouri, United States
| 
|-
| Win
|align=center| 6–0
| Damian Grabowski
| Decision (unanimous)
| Bellator 29
| 
|align=center| 3
|align=center| 5:00
| Milwaukee, Wisconsin, United States
| 
|-
| Win
|align=center| 5–0
| Rogent Lloret
| Decision (unanimous)
| Bellator 25
| 
|align=center| 3
|align=center| 5:00
| Chicago, Illinois, United States
| 
|-
| Win
|align=center| 4–0
| John Orr
| Decision (unanimous)
| Bellator 22
| 
|align=center| 3
|align=center| 5:00
| Kansas City, Missouri, United States
| 
|-
| Win
|align=center| 3–0
| Pat Bennett
| Decision (unanimous)
| Bellator 17
| 
|align=center| 3
|align=center| 5:00
| Boston, Massachusetts, United States
| 
|-
| Win
|align=center| 2–0
| Joel Wyatt
| TKO (punches)
| Matrix Fights 1
| 
|align=center| 1
|align=center| 2:23
| Philadelphia, Pennsylvania, United States
| 
|-
| Win
|align=center| 1–0
| Gary Hamen
| Submission (neck crank)
| Max Fights 8: Elimination
| 
|align=center| 1
|align=center| 1:13
| Fargo, North Dakota, United States
|

See also
 List of Bellator MMA alumni
 List of undefeated mixed martial artists
 List of male mixed martial artists
 Minnesota Golden Gophers wrestling

Notes and references

External links

Cole Konrad profile at the National Wrestling Hall of Fame

The Official Minnesota Gopher Website
The Official Wrestling site of the NCAA
The Official site of USA Wrestling

1984 births
Living people
American male mixed martial artists
Mixed martial artists from Wisconsin
Heavyweight mixed martial artists
Mixed martial artists utilizing collegiate wrestling
Mixed martial artists utilizing freestyle wrestling
Mixed martial artists utilizing Greco-Roman wrestling
Bellator MMA champions
American male sport wrestlers
Minnesota Golden Gophers wrestlers
Sportspeople from Appleton, Wisconsin
People from Neenah, Wisconsin
Big Ten Athlete of the Year winners